In finance, a volatility swap is a forward contract on the future realised volatility of a given underlying asset. Volatility swaps allow investors to trade the volatility of an asset directly, much as they would trade a price index.  Its payoff at expiration is equal to 

where:
 is the annualised realised volatility,
 is the volatility strike, and
 is a preagreed notional amount.

The underlying is usually a financial instrument with an active or liquid options market, such as foreign exchange, stock indices, or single stocks.  
Unlike an investment in options, whose volatility exposure is contaminated by its price dependence, these swaps provide pure exposure to volatility alone. This is truly the case only for forward starting volatility swaps. However, once the swap has its asset fixings its mark-to-market value also depends on the current asset price. One can use these instruments to speculate on future volatility levels, to trade the spread between realized and implied volatility, or to hedge the volatility exposure of other positions or businesses.

Volatility swaps are more commonly quoted and traded than the very similar but simpler variance swaps, which can be replicated with a linear combination of options and a dynamic position in futures.  The difference between the two is convexity: The payoff of a variance swap is linear with variance but convex with volatility.
That means, inevitably, a static replication (a buy-and-hold strategy) of a volatility swap is impossible.  However, using the variance swap as a hedging instrument and targeting volatility, volatility can be written as a function of variance:

then, if the probability of negative realised volatilities is negligible, future volatilities could be assumed to be normal with mean  and standard deviation :

then the hedging coefficients are:

Definition of the realized volatility
Definition of the annualized realized volatility depends on traders viewpoint on the underlying price observation, which could be either discretely or continuously in time. For the former one, with the analogous construction to that of the variance swap, if there are  sampling points of the observed underlying prices, says, 
where 
Define  the natural log returns.
Then the discrete-sampling annualized realized volatility is defined by

which basically is the square root of annualized realized variance.

The continuous version of the annualized realized volatility is defined by means of the square root of quadratic variation of the underlying price log-return:

where  is the instantaneous volatility of the underlying asset. 
Once the number of price's observation increase to infinity, one can find that  converges in probability to  i.e.

representing the interconnection and consistency between the two approaches.

Pricing and valuation
In general, for a specified underlying asset, the main aim of pricing swaps is to find a fair strike price since there is no cost to enter the contract. One of the most popular approaches to such fairness is exploiting the Martingale pricing method, which is the method to find the expected present value of given derivative security with respect to some risk-neutral probability measure (or Martingale measure). And how such a measure is chosen depends on the model used to describe the price evolution. 

Mathematically speaking, if we suppose that the price process  follows the Black-Scholes model under the martingale measure , then it solves the following SDE:

where:
 represents the swap contract expiry date,
 is (time-dependent) risk-free interest rate,
 is (time-dependent) price volatility, and

which gives

due to the zero price of the swap, defining the value of a fair volatility strike. The solution can be discovered in various ways. Alternatively, Upon certain restrictions, one can utilize the value of the European options to approximate the solution.

Pricing volatility swap with continuous-sampling
, the volatility strike  can be approximated by the function

which is resulted from applying Taylor's series on the normal distribution parts of the Black-Scholes formula.

See also
 Variance swap
 Volatility (finance)
 Forward volatility

References

External links
 Prepackaged Volatility Plays

Derivatives (finance)
Swaps (finance)